is an uninhabited volcanic island located in the Tokara Islands, part of the Kagoshima Prefecture, Japan.

Geography

The only known volcanic activity on either peak was towards the end of the Edo period, around 1835 ± 30 years. The inside of both caldera are forested, whereas the outer slopes of both mountains is largely barren.

The local climate is classified as subtropical, with a rainy season from May through September.

It is another exposed portion of the caldera rim of  the same stratovolcano as Yokoate-jime.

History
Yokoate-jima is surrounded by cliffs, making landing difficult. It does not appear to have ever had permanent human habitation.
During the Edo period, Yokoate-jima was part of Satsuma Domain and was administered as part of Kawabe District. In 1896, the island was transferred to the administrative control of Ōshima District, Kagoshima, and from 1911 was administered as part of the village of Toshima, Kagoshima. From 1946 to 1952, the island was administered by the United States as part of the Provisional Government of Northern Ryukyu Islands.

See also

 List of volcanoes in Japan
 List of islands
 Desert island

References

National Geospatial Intelligence Agency (NGIA). Prostar Sailing Directions 2005 Japan Enroute. Prostar Publications (2005).

External links

 

Tokara Islands
Volcanoes of Kagoshima Prefecture
Uninhabited islands of Japan
Stratovolcanoes of Japan
Islands of Kagoshima Prefecture